Elevation is a cannabis shop on the Squaxin Island Tribe trust lands at Kamilche, Washington, across Washington State Route 108 from the tribe's Little Creek Casino. It became the first tribally operated cannabis shop in the United States in November 2015.

See also
Cannabis on American Indian reservations

References

2015 establishments in Washington (state)
Buildings and structures in Mason County, Washington
Companies based in Mason County, Washington
Cannabis dispensaries in the United States